Novoaptikovo (Yañı Äptek) is a rural locality (a selo) and the administrative centre of Sayranovsky Selsoviet, Ishimbaysky District, Bashkortostan, Russia. The population was 1,421 as of 2010. There are 25 streets.

Geography 
Novoaptikovo is located 26 km east of Ishimbay (the district's administrative centre) by road. Aptikovo is the nearest rural locality.

References 

Rural localities in Ishimbaysky District